Miguel Ángel Falasca Fernández (29 April 1973 – 22 June 2019) was an Argentine-born Spanish professional volleyball player and coach. He was a member of the Spain national team from 1993 to 2009, a participant in the Olympic Games Sydney 2000, and the 2007 European Champion.

Personal life
Falasca was born in Mendoza, Argentina. His grandfather came from Italy. His father Juan Carlos was a retired volleyball player from Argentina, and his mother was a native Spaniard. At the age of 16, due to the unstable economic situation in Argentina, the Falasca family decided to move to Spain. Miguel, his parents, sister Mariel and his younger brother Guillermo, were sent to Málaga first, and then to the Canary Islands. He was married to Esther Custodio. They had two children - his daughter called Sara (2004) and his son Daniel (2002).

Death
On 21 June 2019 Falasca was at the wedding of his friend and assistant of the Saugella Monza club in Italy, when he felt ill and went to his hotel room. He died of a heart attack the next day at the age of 46 in Varese where he was staying with his wife, despite a resuscitation attempt.

Career as coach
Falasca had been working as a first coach of PGE Skra Bełchatów since 2013. In the first season of his work, PGE Skra won a title of Polish Champion 2013/2014. It was the 8th title of Polish Champion in the club's history. On July 1, 2014, the club extended the contract with him until 2017. In February 2016 he was head coach of the Czech Republic men's national volleyball team. In March 2016 PGE Skra Bełchatów led by Falasca lost the second match with Zenit Kazan in playoffs 6 of CEV Champions League (the first match Skra won 3–2). After this loss Falasca has been dismissed during the subsequent club meeting. The decision was announced on March 28, 2016. In May 2016 he signed a two-year contract with Italian club Gi Group Monza.

Honours

As a player
 CEV Champions League
  2002/2003 – with Kerakoll Modena
  2011/2012 – with PGE Skra Bełchatów
 FIVB Club World Championship
  Doha 2009 – with PGE Skra Bełchatów
  Doha 2010 – with PGE Skra Bełchatów
 CEV Cup
  2001/2002 – with Knack Roeselare
  2005/2006 – with Portol Palma de Mallorca
 CEV Challenge Cup
  2004/2005 – with Son Amar Palma de Mallorca
  2012/2013 – with Ural Ufa
 National championships
 1996/1997  Spanish Cup, with CV Las Palmas
 2000/2001  Belgian SuperCup, with Knack Roeselare
 2004/2005  Spanish Cup, with Portol Palma de Mallorca
 2005/2006  Spanish Cup, with Portol Palma de Mallorca
 2005/2006  Spanish Championship, with Portol Palma de Mallorca
 2006/2007  Spanish Championship, with Portol Palma de Mallorca
 2007/2008  Spanish Championship, with Portol Palma de Mallorca
 2008/2009  Polish Cup, with PGE Skra Bełchatów
 2008/2009  Polish Championship, with PGE Skra Bełchatów
 2009/2010  Polish Championship, with PGE Skra Bełchatów
 2010/2011  Polish Cup, with PGE Skra Bełchatów
 2010/2011  Polish Championship, with PGE Skra Bełchatów
 2011/2012  Polish Cup, with PGE Skra Bełchatów
Universiade
 1995  Summer Universiade

As a coach
 CEV Challenge Cup
  2018/2019 – with Saugella Monza
 National championships
 2013/2014  Polish SuperCup, with PGE Skra Bełchatów
 2013/2014  Polish Championship, with PGE Skra Bełchatów
 2015/2016  Polish Cup, with PGE Skra Bełchatów

Individual awards
 2007: FIVB World Cup – Best Setter
 2009: Polish Cup – Best Server
 2009: European League – Best Setter
 2012: Polish Cup – Most Valuable Player
 2012: Polish Cup – Best Setter

References

External links

 
 Coach profile at LegaVolley.it 
 
 Player profile at LegaVolley.it 
 Player profile at PlusLiga.pl 
 
 
 Coach/Player profile at Volleybox.net

1973 births
2019 deaths
Sportspeople from Mendoza, Argentina
Argentine emigrants to Spain
Spanish men's volleyball players
Spanish volleyball coaches
Volleyball coaches of international teams
Olympic volleyball players of Spain
Volleyball players at the 2000 Summer Olympics
Universiade medalists in volleyball
Medalists at the 1995 Summer Universiade
Universiade silver medalists for Spain
Mediterranean Games medalists in volleyball
Mediterranean Games silver medalists for Spain
Competitors at the 2009 Mediterranean Games
Spanish expatriate sportspeople in Italy
Expatriate volleyball players in Italy
Spanish expatriate sportspeople in Belgium
Expatriate volleyball players in Belgium
Spanish expatriate sportspeople in Poland
Expatriate volleyball players in Poland
Spanish expatriate sportspeople in Russia
Expatriate volleyball players in Russia
Spanish expatriate sportspeople in the Czech Republic
Skra Bełchatów players
Ural Ufa volleyball players
Skra Bełchatów coaches
Setters (volleyball)